Kim Yeong-nam may refer to:

 Kim Yong-nam (born 1928), North Korean politician
 Kim Young-nam (born 1960), South Korean sport wrestler
 Kim Yeong-nam (footballer) (born 1991), South Korean footballer
 Kim Yeong-nam (diver) (born 1996), South Korean diver

See also

 Kim Jeong-nam (disambiguation)
 Yeong-nam (given name)
 Yong-nam (given name)
 Kim (surname)